Xenophora senegalensis is a species of large sea snail, a marine gastropod mollusk in the family Xenophoridae, the carrier shells.

Description

Distribution

References

Xenophoridae
Molluscs of the Atlantic Ocean
Invertebrates of West Africa
Gastropods described in 1873